The Military Cathedral of Our Lady of Mount Carmel (also Military Cathedral of Santiago) is a Catholic church that functions as the episcopal seat of the Military Bishopric of Chile. It is located in the commune of Providencia, in Santiago, the capital of Chile.

The church is dedicated to the religious services of the Chilean Armed Forces and Carabineros, but it is also open to the rest of the community. The current rector of the cathedral is the military chaplain Jaime Casals Cirer.

During the nineteenth century it was the chapel of Lo Bravo, which after 1900 became the Parish of St. Ramon. The cathedral was blessed on March 17, 1986, and was consecrated on December 27, 1994, the feast of St. John the Evangelist.

See also
Roman Catholicism in Chile
Military Ordinariate of Chile

References

Roman Catholic cathedrals in Chile
Churches in Santiago, Chile